By the Light of the Silvery Moon is a Doris Day album (released March 13, 1953) featuring songs from the movie of the same name. It was issued by Columbia Records as a 10" long-playing record, catalog number CL-6248 and as a 45rpm EP set, B-334.

The album was combined with Day's 1951 album, On Moonlight Bay, on a compact disc, issued on January 30, 2001 by Collectables Records.

Track listing
"By the Light of the Silvery Moon" (Gus Edwards/Edward Madden) (with the Norman Luboff Choir)  
"Your Eyes Have Told Me So" (Walter Blaufuss/Gustave Kahn/Egbert Van Alstyne)
"Just One Girl" (Lyn Udall/Karl Kennett) (with the Norman Luboff Choir)
"Ain't We Got Fun?" (Richard A. Whiting/Raymond B. Egan/Gus Kahn) (with the Norman Luboff Choir)  
"If You Were the Only Girl" (Nat D. Ayer/Clifford Grey)  
"Be My Little Baby Bumble Bee" (Henry I. Marshall/Stanley Murphy) (with the Norman Luboff Choir)
"I'll Forget You" (Ernest Ball/Annelu Burns)
"King Chanticleer" (Nat D. Ayer/Seymour Brown) (with the Norman Luboff Choir)

References

1953 soundtrack albums
Doris Day soundtracks
Columbia Records soundtracks
Musical film soundtracks